Belleville is a city in and the county seat of Republic County, Kansas, United States.  As of the 2020 census, the population of the city was 2,007.

History
Belleville was founded in 1869, and incorporated as a city in 1878. It was named for Arabelle Tutton, the wife of a member of the town company.

The first post office in Belleville was established in February 1870.

Geography
Belleville is located at  (39.823548, -97.630183).

Demographics

2010 census
As of the census of 2010, there were 1,991 people, 949 households, and 533 families living in the city. The racial makeup of the city was 97.5% White, 0.3% African American, 0.2% Native American, 0.6% Asian, 0.5% from other races, and 1.0% from two or more races. Hispanic or Latino of any race were 1.4% of the population.

There were 949 households, of which 19.8% had children under the age of 18 living with them, 47.3% were married couples living together, 6.7% had a female householder with no husband present, 2.1% had a male householder with no wife present, and 43.8% were non-families. 41.3% of all households were made up of individuals, and 24.5% had someone living alone who was 65 years of age or older. The average household size was 1.99 and the average family size was 2.67.

The median age in the city was 51.6 years. 18.1% of residents were under the age of 18; 4.5% were between the ages of 18 and 24; 18% were from 25 to 44; 26.5% were from 45 to 64; and 32.9% were 65 years of age or older. The gender makeup of the city was 46.3% male and 53.7% female.

2000 census
As of the census of 2000, there were 2,239 people, 1,045 households, and 606 families living in the city. The racial makeup of the city was 98.35% White, 0.27% African American, 0.18% Native American, 0.31% Asian, 0.31% from other races, and 0.58% from two or more races. Hispanic or Latino of any race were 0.80% of the population.

There were 1,045 households, out of which 20.4% had children under the age of 18 living with them, 49.0% were married couples living together, 7.2% had a female householder with no husband present, and 42.0% were non-families. 39.8% of all households were made up of individuals, and 23.3% had someone living alone who was 65 years of age or older. The average household size was 2.01 and the average family size was 2.67.

In the city, the population was spread out, with 17.6% under the age of 18, 5.4% from 18 to 24, 20.0% from 25 to 44, 22.9% from 45 to 64, and 34.1% who were 65 years of age or older. The median age was 51 years. For every 100 females, there were 79.1 males. For every 100 females age 18 and over, there were 78.2 males.

The median income for a household in the city was $26,692, and the median income for a family was $36,515. Males had a median income of $24,743 versus $16,964 for females. The per capita income for the city was $18,989. About 5.4% of families and 8.7% of the population were below the poverty line, including 16.9% of those under age 18 and 7.6% of those age 65 or over.

Media
The city is served by The Belleville Telescope newspaper, established in 1870 and published continuously since 1873.

Education
The community is served by Republic County USD 109 public school district. It was formed in 2006 by the consolidation of Belleville USD 427 and Hillcrest USD 455.

Area attractions
 Blair Theatre
 Boyer Gallery
 Republic County Historical Society Museum
 Belleville High Banks, Named "The fastest dirt track in the world"

Notable people

 Larry Cheney (1886–1969), Major League Baseball player
 Nick Hague (born 1975), NASA astronaut, Colonel in United States Air Force, born in Belleville
 Dean Nesmith, professional football player and noted athletic trainer

References

Further reading

External links

 City of Belleville
 Belleville - Directory of Public Officials
 Belleville History
 Belleville city map, KDOT

Cities in Kansas
County seats in Kansas
Cities in Republic County, Kansas
1869 establishments in Kansas
Populated places established in 1869